= Fireworks Hill =

Fireworks Hill is a hill and public open-space area in Thousand Oaks, California. It occupies 33 acres and is situated on the northern side of the former Thousand Oaks Civic Center at 401 West Hillcrest Drive. The city bought the land in 1994. Today it is the site of the city's annual firework displays on 4 July, hence the name.
